Ginta Lapiņa (born 30 June 1989) is a Latvian fashion model.

Career
Lapiņa was born in Riga, and raised in Aizkraukles and began her modeling career in 2005, after being scouted in Riga by Nils Raumanis, and after placed with MC2 Model Management in New York City. Her first modeling job was for teen clothing brand dElia*s and her runway debut was at the Spring 2008 New York Fashion Week in the Benjamin Cho show. In 2008 she signed with the Women Management modeling agency.

Lapiņa was sued by Women Management for alleged breach of contract when she switched to DNA Model Management, but the Manhattan Supreme Court ruled in her favor. She had countersued the company when she was deceived into doing an ad for German haircare brand Schwarzkopf without full compensation rather than working for Karl Lagerfeld as she was led to believe.

Lapiņa has walked in shows for many notable designers including Shiatzy Chen, Anna Sui, Nina Ricci, Marc Jacobs, Dolce & Gabbana, Prada, Rodarte, Proenza Schouler, Oscar de la Renta, Diane von Furstenberg, Vivienne Westwood, Miu Miu, Yves Saint Laurent, Carolina Herrera, Bottega Veneta, Versace, Valentino, and Louis Vuitton. She has been photographed in Vogue, Marie Claire, Numéro, Harper's Bazaar, Dazed & Confused, W, and on the covers of Velvet and Elle France, among others. 

Lapiņa has been in advertisements for YSL Beauté, NARS, Jill Stuart, Anna Sui, John Galliano, Marc by Marc Jacobs, Sportmax, Uniqlo, Derek Lam, DKNY, Sportmax, and in the Miu Miu Fall/Winter 2010 campaign. In 2010, she was ranked 27th on the Top 50 Models Women List by models.com.

Personal life
Lapiņa was married to American businessman Adam Hock until their divorce in 2017. She has a son with partner Bryant Knight.

References

External links

1989 births
Latvian female models
Living people
Models from Riga